There are at least 21 named lakes and reservoirs in Scott County, Arkansas.

Lakes
Beaver Slough, el.

Reservoirs
Giles Pond, el.  
Lake Hinkle, el.  
Lake Waldron, el.  
Moore Lake, el.  
Moore Lake, el.  
Poteau River Site 11 Dam, el.  
Poteau River Site 13 Lake, el.  
Poteau River Site 14 Lake, el.  
Poteau River Site 17 Lake, el.  
Poteau River Site 18 Lake, el.  
Poteau River Site Five Lake, el.  
Poteau River Site Nine Lake, el.  
Poteau River Site One Lake, el.  
Poteau River Site Seven Lake, el.  
Poteau River Watershed Site 12 Reservoir, el.  
Poteau River Watershed Site 16 Lake, el.  
Poteau River Watershed Site Eight Lake, el.  
Selkirk Lake, el.  
Truman Baker Lake, el.  
Waldron Lake, el.

See also
 List of lakes in Arkansas

Notes

Bodies of water of Scott County, Arkansas
Scott